Story is an unincorporated community in Van Buren Township, Brown County, in the U.S. state of Indiana.

History
Brown County, Indiana, was created in 1836 from portions of Monroe, Delaware, Jackson and Bartholomew counties. The land had been acquired from the Native American tribes in two parts based on a treaty line that ran southeast to northwest. Known as the "Ten O’Clock Treaty Line" and later referred to as the “Indian Boundary Line,” the land southwest of the line was obtained in 1809 in the Treaty of Fort Wayne (1803) known as “Harrison’s Purchase". The land northeast of the line was obtained in 1818 in the Treaty of St. Mary’s, known as the “New Purchase.” The area encompassing the village of Story was opened to European settlement on September 30, 1809. The so-called “Ten O’clock Treaty” opened three million acres (12,000 km) to settlement, the boundary being a line running from Raccoon Creek on the Wabash River near Montezuma to Seymour, marked by a shadow cast at 10:00 a.m. each September 30. That line passed through the heart of what would become the village of Story. Today, that line is denoted by the Story Monument in the center of Story’s village green.

The village of Story is named for Dr. George P. Story, who received a land patent for 173 acres from President Millard Fillmore in 1851. This original land patent is on display at the Story Inn. During the early 1850s, Dr. Story moved from Ohio to settle on the acreage. Family farms, the doctor’s medical practice, a township school and a grist mill were established over the following twenty years, prompting local reference to the area as "Storyville". Formal creation of the village of Story occurred in 1882, when Dr. Arnold S. Griffitt continued operation of the medical practice and farming operations, and established a dry goods store that housed the first post office. The village’s first church congregation was also founded. The Story-Griffitt House (a c.1858 I-house) is now part of Story Inn.

Story grew in regional importance during the nineteen teens as other villages in Van Buren Township, Brown County, Indiana began to fade. Due to regional prominence of the general store it continued to remain viable into the 1950s. During the 1880s and 1890s, the village centered around the store and grist mill, first owned and operated by Dr. Griffitt and later by Willard Fulks. A saw mill was later added and previously written narratives indicate Story also had a blacksmith shop and a slaughterhouse, both of which were commonly found in small rural villages. In 1900, the store and grist mill were sold to Alra and Mary Wheeler. They lived in the Queen Anne style architecture Wheeler-Hedrick House (1894) across from the store and now part of the Story Inn.

After enlarging the original store building sometime between 1911 and early 1915, the building burned in November 1915. Following the fire, one report claimed of Wheeler’s store that “his stock was one of the largest in the county.” The set back was short lived, however, as a new, two-story store building was soon constructed with "Wheeler General Store" prominently painted across the upper facade. Business continued to be successful for the Wheelers—the store supplied several huckster wagons that traveled the region each week and the business included operation of the grain mill. Oral interviews claim the store served as the wool-buying center for the county, with Wheeler taking the wool to mills in Seymour, Indiana, and that it employed six full-time employees.
 
Growth and success of the village and the need to supply huckster wagons prompted another resident to open a second store sometime in the 1920s. However, it had closed by the early 1930s. One source from 1929 states of Story, “the village is now a prosperous little town containing two stores, a non-denominational church, school, and several residences in the midst of fertile farming land.”

Wheeler died in 1921 and in early 1924, Albert and Susan Hedrick purchased the general store, saw mill, the Wheeler home and a small amount of additional land surrounding the buildings. The Hedricks purchased the store and associated businesses in partnership with their oldest son, Ralph, and the store was renamed "Hedrick & Son Grocery". The 1920s into the 1930s were the busiest years for the general store and its associated operations during the Hedrick family ownership. The store sold a wide assortment of necessities including farm equipment, clothing, shoes, local produce and meat. A March 1924 ad shows the store was one of only a handful of Brown County locations offering Certified Seed Potatoes. Meat sold in the store was also processed onsite, with thirty-five hogs butchered in one year alone. By 1930, Ralph and his wife, Brunell, and their young son, Robert, were living in the c.1920 house immediately adjacent to the store. Among other duties, Ralph was operating the saw and feed grain mills and his youngest sister, Clotha, was a sales person in the store. She became known for her pickled bologna.

Farming in the hilly, rocky terrain of what is today the Hoosier National Forest region was a difficult undertaking. Marginal farms with poor soil were made worse with soil run off from clear cutting of the forests. When the government began offering to buy their land in the 1920s for creation of Brown County State Park (opened 1929), many farmers gladly accepted. With the coming of the Great Depression (1929–1933), many families also abandoned their farms in search of work elsewhere, a departure not unlike that narrated in John Steinbeck's, The Grapes of Wrath. Brown County lost half of its population between 1930 and 1940 and much of the farming ceased. Creation of Yellowwood State Forest, Hoosier National Forest and the Charles C. Deam Wilderness Area displaced even more from the area. For these reasons, Brown County is 80% forested today (second-growth, but still impressively mature). The loss of population, and thus customers, began the decline of Story's commercial prosperity.

The United States Army Corps of Engineers flooded the area west of Story in 1960, creating Monroe Reservoir known as Lake Monroe (Indiana), the state's second largest man-made lake. The town of Elkinsville, Indiana, was abandoned and the road that once connected to State Road 46, past the home and studio of artist T. C. Steele (and what is now the T.C. Steele State Historic Site), was closed, cutting Story’s access to Bloomington, Indiana via Elkinsville Road. Elkinsville Road serves as Story’s main street, but it now dead-ends four miles (6 km) to the west at a fallen iron bridge. Further isolated, Story’s decline continued. Clotha operated the store until 1969, installing a lunch counter to serve park visitors and passing motorists, and operating the only fuel service for the surrounding area. The c.1937 Standard Service gold and red crown gas pumps still stand today in front of the building.

This paucity of capital was, in retrospect, a blessing. Little new construction followed the Great Depression, and fortuitously, no one attempted to “modernize” the venerable but aging structures at Story when the rest of the nation embarked upon a campaign to eliminate unsightly wooden floors, stamped tin metal ceilings and globe lighting and replace them with shiny asbestos floor tiles and dropped fiberboard ceilings sporting snazzy new recessed neon bulbs.

Likewise, nature has reclaimed most of Brown County, and today the area surrounding Story is wild and natural. Story sits at the edge of Salt Creek, a labyrinthine  system of quiet, slow-moving tributaries which now form the backwaters of Lake Monroe. This moist bottomland, now under the protection of the Indiana Department of Natural Resources, is a spectacular spawning ground for fish and fowl alike, a place of serenity and raw beauty found nowhere else in Indiana.

Story Inn

The general store continued to operate to some degree through the 1970s. In 1978, Benjamin (one name) and his wife, Cynthia Schultz, purchased four and a half acres that included the grocery store, grist mill, barn, and a small rented house. They initially occupied the second floor of the store building as their residence. Benjamin, an architect and builder with restaurant experience, and Cynthia, a former restaurant owner, jointly pursued their vision of creating a bed and breakfast. In this manner, the "Story Inn" was born. In the decade that followed the couple re-assembled the nearly 24 acres that today defines the old town, converting the upstairs of the grocery store and the surrounding cottages into guest homes and making the name "Story Inn" synonymous with the town itself. The business prospered as destination B&B's gained popularity.

Benjamin and Cynthia Schultz sold the Story Inn in 1992, and the town once again fell into hard times. A federal bankruptcy was followed by receivership, and the entire town was sold at sheriff's sale on February 14, 1999, to an entity owned by Rick Hofstetter, an Indianapolis attorney and preservationist, and Frank Mueller, a German-born restaurateur. Hofstetter and Mueller had previously helped to renovate the iconic Athenaeum (Das Deutsche Haus) in Indianapolis, Hofstetter serving as the first President of the Athenaeum Foundation (from 1992-4) and Mueller as the manager of the Rathskeller Restaurant in its basement (from 1993-5). Today, the Athenaeum is recognized as a National Historic Landmark.

The village of Story, Indiana, is now a country inn/bed & breakfast offering fine dining, catering, and accommodations. The second floor of the Old General Store (Wheeler-Hedrick General Store; local lore is that it was also once a Studebaker buggy dealership where wagons and buggy were assembled) has been renovated into four quaint bed & breakfast accommodations notable for their year-round occupant, the “Blue Lady.” The Blue Lady is a mirthful albeit innocuous apparition with flowing white robes whose cheeky behavior has been observed by Story Inn employees and recorded in guest books since the 1970s. The Treaty House, Doc Story’s homestead (Story-Griffitt House), the Alra Wheeler homestead (Wheeler-Hedrick House), the Carriage House, the Old Mill (Grain Mill), the Pruitt-Schultz House and another c.1930 house have each been tastefully and authentically renovated into guest cottages, many with kitchenettes and hot tubs.

Story’s Old General Store, replete with its creaky wooden floors, pot-bellied stove and long-retired Standard Oil Crown gas pumps out front, is now a celebrated gourmet restaurant open year-round serving breakfast, lunch and dinner. Much of the history of Story, Brown County and the region which straddles the Ohio River, is humorously depicted in Rick Hofstetter's book, Kentuckiana Roads: A Freidenker's Story of Life in America's Flyover Middle (Algora Publishing, NY: 2017). In March, 2019, the village was listed on the National Register of Historic Places.

Story Inn hosts the annual Indiana Wine Fair in May. The Inn is just thirteen miles from the village of Nashville, Indiana and is located adjacent to the southwestern boundary of Brown County State Park.

References

External links

Unincorporated communities in Brown County, Indiana
Unincorporated communities in Indiana
1851 establishments in Indiana
Populated places established in 1851